Gramma brasiliensis is a species of  fish endemic to the Atlantic coast of Brazil where it is a reef inhabitant.  It prefers areas with rocks or coral.  This species can reach a length of  SL.  It can also be found in the aquarium trade.

References

brasiliensis
Fish of Brazil
Endemic fauna of Brazil
Southeastern South American coastal fauna
Fish described in 1998